Culture Depot is a Korean drama production and artist management company. It is a subsidiary of Studio Dragon.

History
Culture Depot was founded in 2010 as an exhibition and performance planning company. Since 2012, it worked as a management agency for actress Jun Ji-hyun following her departure from SidusHQ. In the following years, it expanded its actor lineup and signed television screenwriter Park Ji-eun.

In January 2016, Culture Depot was acquired by CJ E&M, and later branched into drama production. A few months later, the company was integrated into CJ E&M's then-newly launched subsidiary, Studio Dragon.

Works

Managed people

Current

Actors
 Han Dong-ho 
 Yoon Ji-min

Musician
 2AM

Screenwriter
 Park Ji-eun

Former
 Jun Ji-hyun 
 Kim So-hyun 
 Seo Ji-hye 
 Yoon Ji-on 
 Claudia Kim 
 Ko So-young 
 Park Min-young 
 Jo Jung-suk

References

External links
 

Studio Dragon
Television production companies of South Korea
Talent agencies of South Korea
Mass media companies established in 2010
Companies based in Seoul
2010 establishments in South Korea